USC Pacific Asia Museum is an Asian art museum located at 46 N. Los Robles Avenue, Pasadena, California, United States.

The museum was founded in 1971 by the Pacificulture Foundation, which purchased "The Grace Nicholson Treasure House of Oriental Art" from the City of Pasadena. Grace Nicholson donated the structure to the city for art and cultural purposes in 1943 and was a dealer in Native American and, later, Asian art and antiques. It houses some 15,000 rare and representative examples of art from throughout Asia and the Pacific Islands. In 2013, the museum became part of the University of Southern California. The building was temporarily closed beginning June 27, 2016 until December 2017 for a seismic retrofit and renovation. It has reopened as of December 8, 2017 with new operating hours.

The building, which is listed in the National Register of Historic Places, was built in 1926 and designed by the architectural firm of Marston, Van Pelt & Maybury. It is designed in the style of a Chinese imperial palace and features a central courtyard with a garden, a small pool, and decorative carvings.

Galleries
 The Art of Pacific Asia
 Japanese
 Snukal Ceramics
 Journeys: The Silk Road
 South and Southeast Asian
 Himalayan
 Korean

Notable exhibits

One of the museum's 2009 exhibits looked at the mash-up of Chinese calligraphy and American graffiti. US-China Today has an article and slide show on the exhibit and a video featuring the curator and a couple of the artists who contributed to the exhibit: Calligraffiti: Crossing the Divide.

 China Modern: Designing Popular Culture 1910-1970 (August 6, 2010- Feb. 6, 2011)
 Japan in Blue and White (March 25, 2010- March 6, 2011)
"Following the box"- Exhibition inspired by found photographs taken in India during World War II  ( Sep 2019- Jan 2020)

California Historical Landmark Marker
California Historical Landmark Marker NO. 988 at the site reads:
NO. 988 PACIFIC ASIA MUSEUM (GRACE NICHOLSON'S TREASURE HOUSE OF ORIENTAL AND WESTERN ART) - Grace Nicholson, a noted collector and authority on American Indian and Asian Art and artifacts, supervised the design of her combination gallery and museum which was completed in 1929. It has been called an outstanding example of 1920s revival architecture and is unique for its use of Chinese ornamentation.

See also
Chinese garden - the museum courtyard

References

External links

 official USC Pacific Asia Museum website

Asian art museums in California
Museums in Pasadena, California
California Historical Landmarks
Buildings and structures on the National Register of Historic Places in Pasadena, California
University museums in California
University of Southern California
Art in Greater Los Angeles